Jutta Stoltenberg (born 7 September 1991) is a Finnish ice hockey defenseman, currently playing with HPK Kiekkonaiset of the Naisten Liiga. She represented Finland in the women's ice hockey tournament at the 2011 Winter Universiade, where the Finnish team won silver.

As a junior player, Stoltenberg competed with the Finnish national under-18 team at the IIHF World Women's U18 Championship in 2008 and 2009.

Playing career
Stoltenberg has played the entirety of her club career, which began in 2008, with HPK Kiekkonaiset, the women's representative ice hockey team of the sports club Hämeenlinnan Pallokerho (HPK) in Hämeenlinna. She served as HPK Kiekkonaiset captain for the 2017–18 and 2018–19 seasons and as alternate captain in the 2011–12, 2016–17, and 2019–20 seasons. 

With HPK, Stoltenberg won the inaugural Aurora Borealis Cup in 2011, Finnish Championship silver in 2016, and Finnish Championship bronze in 2009, 2010, 2012, and 2014. Stoltenberg served as HPK alternate captain in the 2011–12 IIHF European Women Champions Cup, where the team ultimately won bronze.

Stoltenberg has played over 300 games in the Naisten Liiga and its direct predecessor, the Naisten SM-sarja, making her first on the list of most games played by a still-active defenceman in the Naisten Liiga and fourth on the list of most games played of all players still active in the Naisten Liiga.

References

External links

 

Living people
1991 births
Sportspeople from Hamburg
Finnish women's ice hockey defencemen
HPK Kiekkonaiset players
Universiade medalists in ice hockey
Universiade silver medalists for Finland
Competitors at the 2011 Winter Universiade
Finnish people of German descent